Satuba is a municipality located in the Brazilian state of Alagoas. Its population was 13,936 (2020) and its area is 43 km².

References

Municipalities in Alagoas